James Ralph (1705 – 24 January 1762) was an American-born English political writer, historian, reviewer, and Grub Street hack writer known for his works of history and his position in Alexander Pope's Dunciad B.  His History of England in two volumes (1744–46) and The Case of the Authors by Profession of 1758 became the dominant narratives of their time.

Life in America
The Dictionary of American Biography places Ralph's birth in New Jersey, and probably in Elizabethtown and the year as 1705 (Kenny 331), but Okie gives a fifteen-year range for birth (1695–1710) and suggests that he was born near Philadelphia (Okie 873).  These two Colonial cities were separated by seventy miles of indifferent roads, so the distance is considerable.  One reason for the different locations is that the first solid fact about Ralph is his marriage to Mary Ogden in 1724 in Elizabethtown and the birth of the couple's daughter, Mary Ralph, that year in Elizabethtown.  That same year, however, Ralph was in Philadelphia, working as a clerk and a part of a literary society that included Benjamin Franklin (Okie 873).  In his Autobiography, Franklin recalled Ralph as a man of exquisite manners and declares, "I think I never knew a prettier talker" (quoted in Okie 874).  Franklin's account provides the details for the next years of Ralph's life.  In the same year as his daughter's birth, Ralph had a falling out with his in-laws, and he deserted his family to sail with Franklin to London, although, later, Ralph did correspond with his daughter.

Arrival in London and poetry

Upon arrival in London, Ralph unsuccessfully sought to find work as a copyist, editor, or actor (Okie 874).  Franklin loaned Ralph money for living expenses, and Ralph eventually found work as a village school master in Berkshire, under Franklin's name.  Ralph had taken a milliner for a mistress in London, and when he left for Berkshire he asked Franklin to take care of his mistress.  Franklin attempted to do so by making advances to her.  She rejected him, and Ralph quarrelled with Franklin and used the argument to renege on the loans Franklin had made him (Autobiography of Franklin, Okie 874).  Franklin dedicated his Dissertation Upon Liberty and Necessity, Pleasure and Pain, to Ralph because he felt responsible for weakening Ralph's religious convictions (Kenny 331).

Franklin returned to America in 1726, but Ralph stayed, and he attempted to be a poet.  In 1727, Ralph read James Thomson's Winter and imitated it with The Tempest, or the Terrors of Death, and he followed that in 1728 with Night.  1728 was also the year of the publication of the Dunciad A, and Ralph joined in the attacks on Pope with Sawney.  Relatively far from the scene of literary life and not particularly noticed by either political party, Sawney needs explanation.  Laird Okie suggests that Sawney, an Heroic Poem Occasion'd by the Dunciad was written to defend professional authors and hack writers, rather than to attack Pope for political reasons (Okie 874).  Whatever the reason, Pope noticed and responded in the Dunciad Variorum.  In Book III, 165–166, Pope wrote:

"Silence, ye Wolves! while Ralph to Cynthia howls
And makes Night hideous — Answer him, ye Owls!"

The answer was a tour de force and encompasses not only Ralph's grandiosity, but also his imitation of Thomson's verse.  Ralph thought that the attack soured his reception with booksellers and that they would no longer publish him simply because of Pope's insult, and because Pope's notes dismissed Ralph as a "low writer."  His belief is understandable, but it is unlikely, given the responses that James Moore Smythe, Edward Cooke, and Leonard Welsted got from their mentions in Dunciad.

Association with Henry Fielding

In 1728, Ralph published The Touchstone.  It was a burlesque of the tout guides to London, and it gives its reader humorous advice on going about the town (as John Gay's Trivia had done in 1716) and directs them toward London's seamier 'attractions.'  In it, he suggested a series of plays that should be done based on English folklore, such as Tom Thumb.  Martin Battestin, Kenny, and Okie all agree that this work brought Ralph to the attention of Henry Fielding, who used the hints for his own Tragedy of Tragedies (Tom Thumb) in 1730.  The idea of the mock tragedy on folklore figures could date to Jonathan Swift's A Tale of a Tub, where Swift suggests such things as important philosophical works.  Fielding and Ralph became friends, and Ralph wrote the prologue to Fielding's The Temple Beau.  Ralph owned shares of Fielding's Little Theatre, Haymarket.

Also in 1730, Ralph wrote a ballad opera called The Fashionable Lady.  It was staged, and Kenny argues that it is the first American play to be produced in London.  His claim requires John Crowne being disqualified for English birth, and it has the additional problem of defining "American" solely as the territories that would declare independence in 1775 (Kenny 332).  Any stipulation of "first" is vexatious, but his play had mild success.  Ralph also contributed to The Prompter while involved in the Little Theatre.

This James Ralph is not to be confused with the James Ralph junior, who was appointed as the Surveyor of Houses for Cambridgeshire in 1733. That James Ralph died in Cambridge in 1743, and William Teuting was appointed as Surveyor in his place.

Fielding and Ralph collaborated extensively over the next few years, and Fielding would remain a friend of Ralph's until his death.  While some, such as Battestin, have argued that Ralph's politics and Fielding's diverged, the publication evidence is difficult to interpret with certainty.  In 1737, the political censorship  and restrictions of Licensing Act put an end to the Little Theatre and to Fielding's dramatic career.  Fielding was heavily involved in the anti-Walpole opposition, and Ralph joined him.  In the 1730s, Ralph wrote for the anti-Walpolean Weekly Register and Daily Courant.

After the Licensing Act, Ralph co-edited The Champion with Fielding, where he wrote, primarily, the essays on politics (Okie 874).  He also wrote attacks on the Walpole administration for its handling of the War of Jenkins' Ear and general corruption and graft.  These charges were a commonplace of both the Tory and Patriot Whig coalitions, and Ralph was more associated with the latter.  Robert Walpole was elevated out of the House of Commons in 1742 but continued to effectively control ministry politics from Lords, and in 1743 Ralph edited The Critical History of the Administration of Sir Robert Walpole.  The same year, Fielding's most severe satire of Walpole appeared in the form of Jonathan Wild.  The Champion ran with Ralph's input to 1744.

Association with Dodington and party politics

In 1742, Ralph wrote a counter to Sarah Churchill's Account of the Conduct of the Dowager Duchess of Marlborough, attacking her and her deceased husband as self-serving politicians.  In 1743, Ralph began his association with his future patron, George Bubb Dodington by editing Old England with William Guthrie.  The journal was sponsored by Dodington and the Earl of Chesterfield.  He became Dodington's personal secretary and, when Dodington joined the administration briefly, received a £200 pension in 1744.

In 1744–46, Ralph wrote one of his two most important works, A history of England during the reigns of King William, Queen Anne, and King George I, with an introductory review of the royal brothers Charles and James.  The work ran to two volumes and never got beyond William's reign.  However, the work was a direct counter to the histories of John Oldmixon and other whig historians.  Okie characterises Ralph's historical point of view as "country party."  While that would usually equate to "tory" in the 1740s, Ralph wrote from the point of view of someone outside London, someone without an interest in affairs of court.  His history is superior to Rapin's London-bound history and addressed economic history for the first time in English historiography (Okie 875).  Ralph points out the corruption and absurdity of all the courtiers and Parliamentarians who had acted out of self-interest.  Also in 1744, Ralph wrote The Use and Abuse of Parliaments in two volumes.  These two vast works of history were remarkable feats of prolixity.  This work was another somewhat cynical view of the history of Parliament in the 17th century.

Both Dodington and Ralph moved into opposition again, and in 1747 he began the pro-Frederick, Prince of Wales newspaperThe Remembrancer.  He also acted as an intermediary for Frederick with Dodington in getting the latter out of the administration.  The Prince of Wales's country party came to an effective end with the Prince's death in 1751, and Ralph began to work with the Duke of Bedford in opposition again.  With William Beckford and the Duke of Bedford, Ralph began another periodical, The Protestor, in 1751.  Of his political writing and party service, Kenny says that, although he wrote for pay, he was reliable, and "once bought, he stayed bought" (Kenny 332).

After politics

According to Kenny, David Garrick was instrumental in Ralph's obtaining a pension of £300 to renounce political writing for life (Kenny 332).  Okie suggests, instead, that Ralph was "pensioned into silence" by the Pelham administration in 1753 (Okie 875).  Whether Garrick and his tory-leaning friends were instrumental or not, Ralph had to agree to disavow political writing to receive the pension.

In 1756, he began as a reviewer for The Monthly Review, where he would review historical and political writing.  He did, however, stay clear of reflections on contemporary matters.  His expressions of political feeling were restrained to his letters, and Kenny points out that he was very free in his letters to the Duke of Newcastle, where he even argued that the Stamp tax be expanded to the American colonies in 1756 (Kenny 331).

Ralph's second important work came in 1758, with The Case of the Authors by Profession or Trade Stated.  Because of his long history of political writing, he published this work anonymously.  In this work, he argues that the old system of patronage was ending and that writers were now completely at the mercy of booksellers and theatre directors.  They would write empty works without merit because they had no other choice.  They would write party pieces because they could not survive otherwise.  The marketplace was a poor master, he argued, as it was mercurial and mercenary.  This portrait of the conditions of print culture would be influential, although it sold poorly in its day, and it would show up in histories by Oliver Goldsmith, Isaac Disraeli, and Thomas Babington Macaulay (Okie 874).  At the same time, the complaint that Ralph lodges is a later mirroring of what Pope had decried in Dunciad—the satire that had ended his poetic career.

When George III acceded, Ralph began negotiating with the Bute administration, and he received a new pension.

Ralph's English wife, Ann, died at Chiswick on 3 February 1760. Ralph also died at Chiswick on 24 January 1762, while he was preparing to edit a pro-Bute newspaper (Okie 874). Their only surviving daughter, Helen Ralph, died about a month later. His mother-in-law, Mrs Ann Curtis, died in 1765, and in her will requested her executor, Sir Henry Cheere, "to pay all the Just Debts of my late Son in Law James Ralph Esquire".  In Philadelphia, Ralph was survived by his daughter from his first American wife, Mary Ralph Garrigues, and her children, one of whom journeyed to London shortly after Ralph's death to ask Benjamin Franklin what he knew about Ralph.

Selected works
 The Fashionable Lady (1730)
 The Fall of the Earl of Essex (1731)
 The Cornish Squire (1734)
 The Astrologer (1744)

Notes

References
Battestin, Martin, with Ruthe Battestin.  Henry Fielding: A Life.  New York: Routledge and Sons, 1989.
Kenny, Robert W. "James Ralph" in Malone, Dumas, ed. The Dictionary of American Biography. Vol. 15, 331–2.  New York: Scribner and Sons, 1935.
Okie, Laird. "Ralph, James (d. 1762)" in Matthew, H.C.G. and Brian Harrison, eds.  Oxford Dictionary of National Biography  vol. 45, 873–5.  London: OUP, 2004, online edition, May 2007  (subscription required for online access). Retrieved 2008-07-29.

Further reading
 Garrigues, George L., He Usually Lived With a Female, Quail Creek Press, 2006, pp. 11–12 (family relationship to and comparison with American journalist Charles Harris Garrigues)
Okie, Laird. Augustan historical writing. 1991.

1762 deaths
18th-century English historians
18th-century American dramatists and playwrights
Year of birth unknown
English male dramatists and playwrights
1705 births
18th-century English male writers